Rudolf Bamler (6 May 1896 – 13 March 1972) was a German general during World War II. Although Bamler was a member of the Nazi Party he would later serve as a leading member of the East German security forces.

Early life
Bamler was born in Osterburg (Altmark), Saxony-Anhalt, the son of Protestant clergyman Johannes Bamler (born 1864) and his wife Anna Garlipp (1873-1932). He enlisted in the Prussian Army and served in the First World War with the 15th Division.

Abwehr

Bamler was attached to the Abwehr as the head of section III (counterespionage) and here he helped to encourage closer co-operation with the Gestapo and Sicherheitsdienst (SD). This role also meant that Bamler maintained a network of informers across German society rivalled only by that of the SD. Although he had a difficult personal relationship with his superior Wilhelm Canaris the two co-operated closely in supporting Canaris' friend Francisco Franco during the Spanish Civil War.

World War II
Following the outbreak of the Second World War Bamler was appointed Chief of Staff of Wehrkreis VII (Munich) before a transfer to the same role in XX (Danzig). Bamler was then made Chief of Staff to the XXXXVII Panzer Corps in 1940. From 1942 to 1944 he was Chief of Staff to the German Army in Norway under Generaloberst Nikolaus von Falkenhorst, having risen to the rank of lieutenant general.

Bamler was then moved to the Eastern Front and from 1 to 27 June he was commander of the 121st Infantry Division, before being replaced by Helmuth Prieß. He was simultaneously commander of the 12th Infantry Division, with Gerhard Engel his replacement. Bamler's commands ended as he had surrendered to the Red Army on 27 June 1944 after commanding the 12th Infantry Division defending the town of Mogilev which had recently been surrounded during Operation Bagration. The German troops in Mogilev were eventually defeated by the Soviet onslaught with the last radio message from the town coming from General Bamler requesting that "Captain Opke of Artillery Regiment 12 receive the Oak Leaves to the Knights Cross for repeated outstanding military exploits". This message was sent at 10 o'clock in the evening and received an hour and 14 minutes later, this would be the last message from Mogilev. Following his capture by Soviet troops he later defected to the Soviet Union.

Later years
Bamler settled in East Germany and worked as a Stasi police officer there from 1946 until his retirement in 1962. He also held the rank of major general in the Kasernierte Volkspolizei. He died in Groß Glienicke aged 77.

References

1896 births
1972 deaths
People from Osterburg (Altmark)
People from the Province of Saxony
Nazi Party members
National Democratic Party of Germany (East Germany) politicians
Socialist Unity Party of Germany members
Lieutenant generals of the German Army (Wehrmacht)
Major generals of the National People's Army (Ground Forces)
German Army personnel of World War I
Reichswehr personnel
Stasi officers
German defectors to the Soviet Union
German prisoners of war in World War II held by the Soviet Union
National Committee for a Free Germany members
Recipients of the Iron Cross, 1st class
Recipients of the Gold German Cross
Recipients of the Patriotic Order of Merit in silver
Military personnel from Saxony-Anhalt